Tazeh Kand-e Muran (also Romanized as Tāzeh Kand-e Mūrān; also known as Tazeh Kand, Tāzeh Kandeh-ye Zahrā, and Tāzeh Kand-e Zahrā) is a village in Ojarud-e Sharqi Rural District, Muran District, Germi County, Ardabil Province, Iran. At the 2006 census, its population was 125, in 27 families.

References 

Towns and villages in Germi County